Andrew Tasman Harold "Nixey" Stewart (23 September 1876 – 12 August 1919) was an Australian rules footballer who played with St Kilda in the Victorian Football League (VFL).

From South Yarra, Stewart also had two brothers, George and Walter, who played for St Kilda.

Stewart was St Kilda's leading goal-kicker in 1898 and 1899, with 23 and 16 goals respectively. His tally in the 1898 season was bettered only by Collingwood's Archie Smith and Geelong's Eddy James.

References

External links

 
 

1876 births
Australian rules footballers from Melbourne
St Kilda Football Club players
South Yarra Football Club players
1919 deaths
People from Prahran, Victoria